George III Valentin, Prince Bibescu (22 March 1880, Bucharest – 2 July 1941, Bucharest) was a Romanian early aviation pioneer and automobile enthusiast.

Family
His parents were Prince George Bibescu (1834-1902) (son of Gheorghe Bibescu) and Valentine de Riquet de Caraman, In 1902, he married Marthe Lucie Lahovary (1886-1973), who took the name Marthe Bibesco. They had one daughter, Valentina, born 27 August 1903.  In 1912, he gave his wife as a present the Mogoșoaia Palace.

Automobiles
Bibescu, together with the engineer and explorer Bazil Assan and the baron Barbu Bellu, was the first person to bring an automobile to Romania. The first two requested one from the brand FN Herstal. Since Bibescu did not have the time to register it, in 1900, Assan became the first person in the country to receive a Vehicle registration plate, 1B. However, Bibescu did not want to allow this, so the Capital Prefecture made an exception and gave him in 1901 the plate 0B, making him the owner of the first plate in Romania.

Aviation
Bibescu had an early interest in aviation; he flew a balloon named "Romania" brought from France 1905. Later he tried to teach himself how to fly a Voisin airplane, also brought from France, but without success. On 6 January 1910 he was awarded Aéro-Club de France pilot's license number 20. 
After returning from France, Bibescu organized the Cotroceni Piloting School in Bucharest where  and Nicolae Capșa were licensed. On 5 May 1912, he founded the Romanian National Aeronautic League.

He was instrumental in founding the Fédération Aéronautique Internationale (FAI).  Between 1927 and 1930, he was vice-president, and between 1930 and 1941 president of the FAI.

He was co-founder of the Romanian Automobile Club (1901), and of the Romanian Olympic Committee (1914). Romania was among the first 6 nations in the world to organize car races. In 1904, he won the Bucharest-Giurgiu-Bucharest auto race, with an average hourly speed of 66 km/h.  In 1905, motorists George Valentin Bibescu, Leon Leonida, and Mihai Ferekide, accompanied by Marthe Bibesco, Maria Ferekide, and Claude Anet, made the first automobile trip to Persia, leaving from Galați and reaching Ispahan. The trip is described by the French writer Claude Anet in his book, "La Perse en automobile à travers la Russie et le Caucase (Les Roses d'Ispahan)".

George Bibescu is buried in the small, white 1688 church on the grounds of Mogoșoaia Palace in Romania

Gallery

See also

 History of aviation
 List of aviation pioneers
 Romanian Air Force

References

External links
 "George Valentin Bibescu 1880–1941", at EarlyAviators
  "George Valentin Bibescu, first Romanian airman", Aeroclubul României
 

1880 births
1941 deaths
Aviation pioneers
George
Nobility from Bucharest
Romanian aviators
Princes Bibescu
Aviation history of Romania
International Olympic Committee members
Presidents of the Romanian Olympic and Sports Committee